Ilya Vladimirovich Belousov (born 29 November 1978) is a former Russian football midfielder.

Club career
He played in the Russian Football National League for FC Neftekhimik Nizhnekamsk in 1997.

References

External links
 Career summary by sportbox.ru
 

1978 births
Living people
Russian footballers
Association football midfielders
FC Neftekhimik Nizhnekamsk players
FC Volga Ulyanovsk players